"Box of Stones" is the debut single by English singer-songwriter Benjamin Francis Leftwich, from his debut studio album Last Smoke Before the Snowstorm (2011). It was released on 19 June 2011 as a digital download in the United Kingdom. The song has peaked to number 195 on the UK Singles Chart and number 24 on the UK Indie Chart.

Music video
A music video to accompany the release of "Box of Stones" was first released onto YouTube on 3 May 2011 at a total length of three minutes.

Track listing

Chart performance

Release history

References

External links
 Official website

2011 singles
Benjamin Francis Leftwich songs
2011 songs